The 2008–09 Southern Professional Hockey League season was the fifth season of the Southern Professional Hockey League.  The regular season began August 24, 2008, and ended April 16, 2009, after a 60-game regular season and a four-team playoff.  The Knoxville Ice Bears captured their second consecutive championship.

Preseason
The Jacksonville Barracudas franchise was suspended from the season due to lack of an search for a arena.  The team would eventually fold.

Regular season

Final standings

‡  William B. Coffey Trophy winners
 Advanced to playoffs

Attendance

President's Cup playoffs

Finals

Awards
SPHL Award winners were announced April 23, 2009.

All-Star selections

References

Southern Professional Hockey League seasons
South